Gisela Uhlen (16 May 1919 – 16 January 2007) was a German film actress and occasional screen writer.

Biography
Uhlen was born Gisela Friedlinde Schreck in Leipzig, Germany as fourth child of Luise Frieda and distillery owner and former opera singer Augustin Schreck.

At the Leipziger Konservatorium she enrolled in a modern dance class, and learnt classical ballet and acrobatics at the opera school. At 15 she decided to become a theatre actress and chose the stage-name Gisela Uhlen. After her final examination as a dancer and during her training period she married ballet teacher Herbert Freund.

At 17 she appeared for the first time at the Schauspielhaus Bochum. In 1938 Heinrich George brought her to the Berliner Schiller-Theater, where she was active until the end of the war. But even before her first stage appearance she had made film tests with Universum Film AG (Ufa), and thereby obtained the leading actress role in the 1936 film . After the war performance of this film was prohibited. Uhlen played a young organist whose lover volunteered to go to the front and there died.

From 1936 through 1960, Uhlen appeared in 23 films, and in 1960 she steered her career into television. Her career was active throughout her lifetime, with her having more than 56 television appearances into 2006, entirely in the German and European realm. 

She married six times, most notably to German writer, director and producer Hans Bertram, with whom she had daughter Barbara Bertram, who also became an actress, but with little success. With Wolfgang Kieling she had a daughter Susanne Uhlen, who is now a successful German actress. During the Cold War, and following her divorce from Hans Bertram, Uhlen fled into East Germany to avoid a custody battle over their daughter, an unusual move in a time when most people were attempting to escape from East Germany, but moved to West Berlin in 1960.

Filmography

Stage appearances

Books
 Umarmungen und Enthüllungen. Berlin : Parthas-Verl., 2002. 
 Meine Droge ist das Leben. Weinheim : Beltz, Quadriga, 1993. 
 Mein Glashaus. Frankfurt/M : Ullstein, 1991.

References

External links 

Gisela Uhlen Partial Filmography with Plot Synopsis
Gisela Uhlen - Postcards, movie cards, covers, books and articles
German wikiquote entry

1919 births
2007 deaths
German film actresses
Best Actress German Film Award winners
Actors from Leipzig
University of Music and Theatre Leipzig alumni
German stage actresses
German television actresses
20th-century German actresses
21st-century German actresses